Collins–Maxwell Community School District (C-M) is a rural public school district headquartered in Maxwell, Iowa.  It operates Collins–Maxwell Elementary School and Collins–Maxwell Middle School-High School, located in Collins and Maxwell, respectively.

The district occupies portions of Story, Jasper, Marshall, and Polk counties. The district serves Collins, Maxwell, and the surrounding rural areas.

History
The district formed on July 1, 1983, as a merger of the former Collins Community and Maxwell Community School districts.school districts.

On July 1, 2019, Corey Lunn became the district's superintendent.

Schools
Collins–Maxwell Elementary
Collins–Maxwell Middle School-High School

Collins–Maxwell High School

Athletics 
The Spartans compete in the Iowa Star Conference, including the following sports:

Cross county (boys and girls)
Volleyball 
Football 
Basketball (boys and girls)
Wrestling 
Track and field (boys and girls)
Golf (boys and girls)
Soccer (boys and girls)
Baseball 
Softball - 2018 and 2019 Class 1A State Champions

See also
List of school districts in Iowa
List of high schools in Iowa

References

External links
 Collins–Maxwell Community School District

School districts in Iowa
Education in Jasper County, Iowa
Education in Marshall County, Iowa
Education in Polk County, Iowa
Education in Story County, Iowa
1983 establishments in Iowa
School districts established in 1983